Lee Ka-shun (born 24 March 1989) is a Hong Kong rugby union player. She made her international debut for Hong Kong in 2013. Lee represented Hong Kong at the 2017 Women's Rugby World Cup.

Biography 
Lee is the former women's record holder for Discus in Hong Kong. She featured for Hong Kong in the 2014 Asia Women's Four Nations and the 2016 Asia Rugby Women's Championship. She played against Fiji in 2016 in a repechage match for the 2017 World Cup.

Lee was selected for Hong Kong's tour of Spain before the World Cup in 2017. In 2019, she was in the squad that beat Netherlands in a two-match series and claimed Hong Kong's first test series win in Europe. She scored a try in the second half of the first test to help her side beat the Dutch women 14–12.

Lee was named in the squad that played in a two-test series against Kazakhstan in December 2022.

References 

1989 births
Living people
Hong Kong people
Hong Kong rugby union players
Hong Kong female rugby union players